Chappaqua is a 1967 American drama film, written and directed by Conrad Rooks. The film is based on Rooks' experiences with drug addiction and includes cameo appearances by William S. Burroughs, Swami Satchidananda, Allen Ginsberg, Moondog, Ornette Coleman, The Fugs, and Ravi Shankar. Rooks had commissioned Coleman to compose music for the film, but his score, which has become known as the Chappaqua Suite, was not used. Ravi Shankar then composed a score.

The picture has become a cult film.

Plot
American Russel Harwick travels to a villa outside Paris to receive treatment for drug addiction. During withdrawals, he experiences a series of flashbacks to his experiences in New York City and other parts of the world, and has numerous hallucinations.

The film briefly depicts Chappaqua, New York, a hamlet in Westchester County, in a few minutes of wintry panoramas. In the film, the hamlet is an overt symbol of drug-free suburban childhood innocence. It also serves as one of the film's many nods to Native American culture. The word "chappaqua" derives from the Wappinger (a nation of the Algonquian peoples) word for "laurel swamp".

Cast
Jean-Louis Barrault as Dr. Benoit
Conrad Rooks as Russel Harwick
William S. Burroughs as Opium Jones
Allen Ginsberg as Messie
Ravi Shankar as Dieu du Soleil
Paula Pritchett as Water Woman
Ornette Coleman as Peyote Eater
Swami Satchidananda as The Guru
Moondog as The Prophet
Ed Sanders, Tuli Kupferberg, Ken Weaver and three others as The Fugs
Rita Renoir
Hervé Villechaize
Penny Brown as the nurse

Production
The film was shot in England, France, India, Jamaica, Mexico, Sri Lanka and the United States.

Release
The film debuted in competition at the 27th Venice International Film Festival where it won the Special Jury Prize, and was subsequently released by Regional Film Distributors, a newly formed subsidiary of Universal Pictures, in New York City on November 5, 1967. It was re-released in 1970 by Minotaur Releasing.

Sources

External links

"Conrad Rooks's Chappaqua Is a Therapeutic Travelogue of the Unconscious" New York Times review, November 6, 1967
Review of Chappaqua at Mondo Digital
Baumann Graphik (movie poster, German theatrical release 1998)

1967 films
1967 drama films
Films about drugs
Films set in New York City
Venice Grand Jury Prize winners
Films scored by Ravi Shankar
William S. Burroughs
The Fugs
Films directed by Conrad Rooks
Films set in Westchester County, New York
1967 directorial debut films
1960s English-language films